The Häfeli DH-2 was a 1910s Swiss two-seat reconnaissance aircraft, built by aircraft department of the Eidgenoessische Konstruktionswerkstaette (K + W) at Thun, Switzerland.

Development and design
Following on from his earlier design (the DH-1), August Häfeli designed a more conventional biplane for reconnaissance duties designated the Häfeli DH-2. It was a two-bay of wood and fabric construction, powered by a 100 hp (75 kW) Mercedes D.I engine, the next five were fitted with an Argus As II water-cooled inline engine. The engine required a large flat radiator which was mounted beside the front cockpit. Performance was disappointing and the aircraft did not go into production. An improved version, the Hafeli DH-3 was developed.

Operational history
The six DH-2s built during 1916 were used to train pilots and observers until they were withdrawn from service in 1922.

Operators

Swiss Air Force

Specifications (DH-2)

References

1910s Swiss military reconnaissance aircraft
Biplanes
Single-engined tractor aircraft
Aircraft first flown in 1916

External links

 ETH-Bibliothek Zürich, Bildarchiv. Flugzeug Häfeli DH-2 M II No 47, Mercedes engine, viewer